The War Dog Memorial was dedicated to the thousands of War Dogs that served during World War I, World War II, the Korean War, the Vietnam War, the Persian Gulf War, Bosnia, Iraq, and Afghanistan.  The memorial also recognizes the service that War Dogs give to the United States of America on countless missions around the world for the Army, Navy, Air Force, Coast Guard, and Marines.  The Memorial was dedicated September 16, 2006.  Joseph Pavone, of Bristol Township, Pennsylvania, created the sculpture.  The Memorial is located in front of the Bristol Township Municipal Building located at 2501 Bath Road, Bristol, PA, 19007.

History 
The War Dogs of the United States of America have a legendary history of bravery and courage on thousands of unnamed foreign fields of battle.  Military analysts estimate that there were as many as ten thousand United States and Allied lives saved during the Vietnam War alone.  The casualty rates in all of the other wars were significantly reduced by thousands as a result of deploying the War Dogs.

Duties 
War Dogs had performed several tasks under their assigned duties, including the following:
 Scout
 Sentry
 Tracker
 Mine & Booby Trap
 Tunnel
 Water Patrol
 Coast Guard
 Search & Rescue
 Explosive Detection

See also 
 Bristol Township, Bucks County, Pennsylvania
 Dogs in warfare
 List of individual dogs
 1st Military Working Dog Regiment
 World War I
 World War II
 Korean War
 Vietnam War
 Gulf War
 Bosnian War
 Iraq War
 War in Afghanistan (2001–present)
 Military history of the United States

References 
 War Dog Memorial, Bristol Township, PA

External links 
 Photo of the War Dog Memorial
 Bristol Township 
 Veterans of Bucks County: Joseph Pavone

2006 establishments in Pennsylvania
Buildings and structures in Bucks County, Pennsylvania
Dog monuments
Military monuments and memorials in the United States
Monuments and memorials in Pennsylvania
2006 sculptures
Bronze sculptures in Pennsylvania
Dogs in the United States